Robinson 2019 was the eighteenth season of Expedition Robinson. This season begins with twenty contestants being split into two tribes, competing against each other to try and win 500,000 SEK Like last season, this season was filmed in Kadavu Group, in Fiji. The season premiered on 17 March 2019 on TV4. Like last season, the season was presented by Anders Öfvergård. The season concluded on 26 May 2019 where Klas Beyer won against Fia Grönborg in a challenge to claim the title and become this year's Robinson.

Season Summary 
Team South initially suffered from absurd amounts of conflicts, caused by a player who was there to "make good TV". He was pulled from the game. The tribe was then led by a group of athletic men (Adnilson, Lucas and Emilio). They kept losing immunity challenges. Three women (Fia, Linn and Bonnie) formed an actual alliance, which is rare in Swedish Survivor, and voted out Adnilson, gaining majority in their tribe.
Both tribes developed a strong team spirit. Team North was led by Klas, a wise and diplomatic man who had good relationships with every player in the game. In Team North, Sebastian was arguably the strongest physical player in the game. He formed a strong relationship with Anna but was voted off for being disliked by the other players.
Just before the merge, Team North lost multiple players to twists and Team South merged with five players against four. However, one member of Team North (Sophie) found a chest with three extra votes. A rare occurrence in Swedish Survivor, both tribes stuck together after the merge, which resulted in Team North voting off Lucas, making it 4 vs 4.
There were two islands separate from the main game: Gränslandet (The Borderland) and Utposten (The Outpost). Before the merge, challenge losers and players voted out went to Gränslandet and after the merge, they went to Utposten. Sebastian eventually returned from Gränslandet. Because he was blindsided by Team North before the merge, there were still hard feelings between them. Team South used that by making false alliances with both sides of Team North, playing them out against each other under the false premise of a permanent alliance.
The other three players who returned from Gränslandet and Utposten were ultimately inconsequential.
Knock-out challenges began at final eight. Just before that, everyone ganged up and voted out Sebastian, the biggest threat.
Despite Team South consisting of three rather physically weak women, there were three even weaker players in the final eight. The final five therefore consisted of the Team South Alliance (the three women's alliance + Emilio) and Klas.
At final four, there was an unexpected final tribal council. The jury decided who was immune and chose Klas, who would likely have been voted off otherwise by the Team South alliance.
Because of the weak opposition, Klas, a physically average man, finished first in every knock-out challenge. Therefore, he had three advantages in the final three challenge, which he also won. Fortunately for him, Emilio was knocked out in the final three, which put Klas against Fia in the final multi-stage obstacle course. The course tested physical ability, map reading, endurance and fire making. Klas completed the course first and won the season.

Finishing order

References

External links

Expedition Robinson Sweden seasons
TV4 (Sweden) original programming
2019 Swedish television series debuts
2019 Swedish television series endings
2019 Swedish television seasons